Justus DaLee (October 1, 1793 – January 5, 1878) was an American folk artist born in Pittstown, New York to James Waterman DaLee and his wife, Anstis Kinnicutt. He married Mary Fowler October 13, 1816 at White Creek, New York, and they had ten children. He served as a musician in the War of 1812 and was a professor of penmanship.

Dalee was a school teacher in New York State and is also known to have worked in Massachusetts. He was known for his miniature naïve art side portraits.  Media used were mixed media, oil, watercolor, and ink.

The earliest dated record of Justus Dalee's activity is a fifty-two page sketchbook entitled "Emblematic Figures, Representations, and Etc., to Please the Eye."

He died on January 5, 1878, in Eden, Wisconsin and is buried in the Odekirk Cemetery, Eden, Fond du Lac County, Wisconsin.

References 

 Davenport, Ray; Davenport's Art Reference: The Gold Edition; 2005
 Dunbier, Lonnie Pierson (Editor); The Artists Bluebook: 34,000 North American Artists to March 2005; 2005
 Rumford, Beatrix; American Folk Portraits from the Abby Aldrich Rockefeller Folk Art Center; 1981

Folk artists
19th-century American painters
American male painters
1793 births
1878 deaths
People from Washington County, New York
Painters from New York (state)
American military personnel of the War of 1812
People from Eden, Wisconsin